Bangham may refer to:

People
Alec Bangham, a British biophysicist
Edward Bangham, a British politician - refer List of MPs elected in the British general election, 1710

Places
Bangham, Tennessee, an unincorporated community in the United States
Bangham, South Australia, a locality in South Australia
Bangham Conservation Park, a protected area in South Australia
Bangham Railway Station, a former railway station located in Bangham, South Australia

Other
Bangham Whistle - a type of Steam whistle  also known as a Helmholtz whistle.